The 2010 United States Senate election in New York took place on November 2, 2010, along with elections to the United States Senate in other states, as well as elections to the United States House of Representatives and various state and local elections. Incumbent Democrat U.S. Senator Chuck Schumer won re-election to a third term. Schumer won every county except for Wyoming, Tioga, and Hamilton counties.

Background 
In the 2004 U.S. Senate election, Schumer had defeated Republican Assemblyman Howard Mills by a 71 to 24 percent margin. Schumer was highly popular in New York, and it was believed that any Republican contender would likely not fare well against him in 2010. Schumer was heavily favored to retain his seat.

In addition to this regular election, there was also a special election to fill the Senate seat vacated by Hillary Clinton, who became the United States Secretary of State on January 21, 2009. In addition, there was the New York gubernatorial election. The existence of two other top-level statewide races, one with a Democratic incumbent perceived as vulnerable and the other an open race, respectively, was believed to lead major New York Republicans to gravitate towards them rather than challenge the popular Schumer.

Republican nomination

Convention

Candidates 
 Gary Berntsen, retired CIA officer, received the party's endorsement on the second round of balloting
 Martin Chicon, candidate for New York Senate in 2008 and New York Republican State Committee member from upper Manhattan.
 George Maragos, Nassau County Comptroller
 James Staudenraus, Long Island resident and 2008 state assembly candidate
 Jay Townsend, Republican strategist (finished second and also qualified for the primary)

Results 
Only two candidates, Berntsen and Townsend, obtained at least 25% of the vote at the New York State Republican Convention on June 1, 2010. Berntsen came in first, but still needed to win the primary in order to win the Republican nomination. Berntsen lost the primary to Jay Townsend.

Primary

Candidates 
 Gary Berntsen
 Jay Townsend

Results

General election

Candidates 
 Anti-Prohibition Party: Randy Credico
 Conservative Party of New York: Jay Townsend
 Democratic Party: Chuck Schumer
 Green Party: Colia Clark
 Libertarian Party: Randy Credico
 Republican Party: Jay Townsend
 Taxpayers Party: Gary Berntsen

Predictions

Fundraising

Polling

Results

Aftermath 
Credico sued the New York State Board of Elections under the Equal Protection Clause of the Fourteenth Amendment because of this unfair treatment regarding ballot access. Despite being nominated by both the Libertarian Party and the Anti-Prohibition Party, in most jurisdictions, he only appeared on the ballot once. On June 19, 2013, the Federal District Court for the Eastern District of New York ruled in favor of Credico. The New York State Board of Elections did not appeal this decision.

References

External links 
 New York State Board of Elections
 Official candidate list
 U.S. Congress candidates for New York at Project Vote Smart
 New York U.S. Senate 2010 from OurCampaigns.com
 Campaign contributions from Open Secrets
 New York Polls graph of multiple polls from Pollster.com
 Election 2010: New York Senate from Rasmussen Reports
 2010 New York Senate Race from Real Clear Politics
 2010 New York Senate Race from CQ Politics
 Race profile from The New York Times

New York
2010
United States Senate